Nordre Trysil Church is a parish church of the Church of Norway in Trysil Municipality in Innlandet county, Norway. It is located in the village of Jordet. It is the church for the Nordre Trysil parish which is part of the Sør-Østerdal prosti (deanery) in the Diocese of Hamar. The gray, wooden church was built in a fan-shaped design in 2000 using plans drawn up by the architect Anders Gunnestad. The church seats about 210 people.

History

In 1992, a cemetery with a bell tower was built in Jordet where the church now stands. Soon after, work began on planning for a church on the site. The architect was Anders Gunnestad from Hamar, and the building contractor was the firm Nymoen og Joten Bygg from Engerdal. The building was constructed in 2000, with the foundation stone being laid in the early spring and the church was consecrated on 26 November 2000 by the Bishop Rosemarie Köhn. The church construction cost , with the municipality paying about 70% of the cost and the rest being paid for with gifts and donations.

See also
List of churches in Hamar

References

Trysil
Churches in Innlandet
Fan-shaped churches in Norway
Wooden churches in Norway
20th-century Church of Norway church buildings
Churches completed in 2000
2000 establishments in Norway